

Group 1 

All times are local

1